David Sale is an American singer-songwriter, who after putting out "Sins of the Father" on Atlantic records under the name Camus, and co-writing and producing a few other projects, he got involved in investigating wrongful convictions. Whose somewhat odd transition landed him on the front page of the St.Louis Post-Disptatch, when he visited his sister and got sucked into the case of Mark Woodworth, a rural farm boy who was framed for murder by questionable characters. "How an amateur sleuth and rock musician became a player in a Chillicothe, Mo., murder." Who was freed and exonerated. With one thing leading to another, he got called out on a case in the mountains of Tennessee. Adam Braseel, a young man visiting old high school friends, who was framed for murder back in 2007, but recently exonerated by Governor Bill Lee of Tennessee.

Sale used his creative talents when he setup a Horror Movie to investigate in a place where few wanted to talk at first.
Sale then got a call from Wayne Grimes from prison and has been working to free him as well as a few others.

Sale, achieved notability back in the 90's as Camus with "sins of the Father", a release on Atlantic Records. The album includes the song Ouch which was featured on the Baywatch episode "Out of the Blue" alongside Cyndi Lauper. In this project he had the opportunity to collaborate with Producers David Kahne and Kevin Killin. He still writes music for short films he puts out on the cases.

History
Previous to the Camus project, Sale was active in New Orleans operating the successful Street Records, an indie label featuring local and regional new indigenous music from 1992 to 1997. He also produced, engineered or consulted on projects for diverse musicians such as Rowland Howard, Willie Deville, Winton, Branford Marsalis and BeauSoleil to name a few during this period.

Sale wrote and produced former Squirrel Nut Zippers vocalist Katharine Whalen's 2007 release Dirty Little Secret on Koch Records. Dirty Little Secret was also cited by No Depression Magazine as a "Genre Busting Beauty". Appearing on World café.

Mr Sale co-directed the documentary On the Bus with Barnaby Greenburg, as well as several music videos for major labels. He has created and directed commercials. He co wrote the film Dark Star with d'Philip Chalmers (in pre-production). Sale's music work was cited as dazzling and seductive by NPR's David Dye.

Recent career

In 2014 Sale formed a production company to develop film and book properties based on his work in the legal system as an investigator and promoter of innocence. The first two cases being "The One Innocent Man" about a Missouri farm boy who wound up being the patsy in a rural crime ring. Spending nearly twenty years in prison.
And "Fear the Hills" the story of a young man named Adam Braseel, imprisoned for a murder and assault that took place in Tracy City – in the foothills of Tennessee.

References

American singer-songwriters
Year of birth missing (living people)
Living people